Clusius  may refer to:
 Carolus Clusius (1526-1609), Flemish doctor and botanist
 Clusius (Ulmus), a hybrid elm cultivar